Susana Renata Žigante (born 22 September 1994) is an American-born Croatian footballer who plays as a goalkeeper, and has been capped to the Croatia national team.

Career
In college, Žigante played for the Grand Canyon Antelopes, make one appearance for the team in 2012. She later played for the UNC Asheville Bulldogs in 2013.

Žigante has appeared for the Croatia national team, including a 3–1 win against Slovenia on 8 March 2017.

Personal life
Žigante's mother Gretchen is a former goalkeeper who played for the United States. Her father, Nenad "Ziggy" Zigante, is a Croatian former footballer and coach born in Yugoslavia. Thus she was eligible to represent Croatia internationally through her father.

References

External links
 
 
 Profile from Grand Canyon Antelopes

1994 births
Living people
Soccer players from Raleigh, North Carolina
Soccer players from North Carolina
Croatian women's footballers
Croatia women's international footballers
American women's soccer players
American people of Croatian descent
Women's association football goalkeepers
Grand Canyon Antelopes women's soccer players
University of North Carolina at Asheville alumni
Croatian Women's First Football League players
ŽNK Osijek players
People from Holly Springs, North Carolina
UNC Asheville Bulldogs women's soccer players